The Rastrapati Bhawan ("Presidential Palace") is the official residence of the President of Nepal, located in Kathmandu, Nepal. It hosts the Office of The President of Nepal. The main palace building was and still is known as Sital Niwas. It was built by Rana Prime Minister Chandra Shumsher JBR in 1923.

History
The palace was built by Chandra Shumsher JBR for his youngest son Krishna Shumsher from his first wife Lokbhakta Lakshmi Devi in the year 1924. Krishna Shamsher because of political pressure from his brothers handed over Sital Niwas to the Government of Nepal in 1948 and later fled Kathmandu to Bangalore in 1961. After the fall of Rana regime Sital Niwas was used by Government of Nepal as Stately Guest House and later converted into Ministry of Foreign Affairs.

Official residence for President of Nepal
After the fall of Monarchy in Nepal, the government of Nepal decided to make Shital Niwas the presidential residence at a cabinet meeting on 4 July 2008. Ram Chandra Paudel, the incumbent President of Nepal, currently resides in this palace. It is located adjacent to Central Investigation Bureau (CIB) headquarters and a military barrack.

Building expansion controversy
At a time when the government's recent bid to shift the Nepal Police Academy elsewhere to expand the President's Office compound was being criticized from various quarters, those familiar with the history of Shital Niwas, the iconic building housing the President's Office, were called for removing the President's Office itself from Shital Niwas to honor the wishes of its rightful owner.

Krishna SJB Rana, a son of Rana prime minister Chandra SJB Rana, had donated the building to the government back in 1950s, realizing that the government formed after the success of the first democratic movement did not have a state guesthouse. Historians say this was a voluntary donation on the part of Krishna Shumsher, as Ranas and the Nepali Congress had jointly formed the coalition government after the movement that ended the 104-year old Rana oligarchy.

Built in European style, Shital Niwas was built on over 140 ropani [13.07 acres]. As the President's Office seeks to expand its compound apparently to develop a helipad and other facilities, removing its adjoining Nepal Police Academy, the bid is being criticized arguing that the latest demands reflect 'hidden ambitions' of the ceremonial president to assume executive roles.

Former foreign minister Ramesh Nath Pandey asked the government to honor the will of Krishna Shumsher, who donated the building for use as state guesthouse. "Shital Niwas was donated to the Nepal government by Krishna Shumsher JB Rana, son of Rana Prime Minister Chandra Shumsher only for the purpose of a 'state guesthouse'. This is written in his will. Shouldn't we be sensitive to the wishes of the generous donor?” he asked.

In fact, the building hosted dozens of visiting VVIPs in the following years. They include Indian prime ministers Jawaharlal Nehru, Chinese premier Zhou Enlai, Queen Elizabeth II, Pakistani President Ayuub Khan, Indian presidents Rajendra Prasad and Radha Krishnan, and the then Japanese prince Akihito.

Shital Niwas remained as state guesthouse until the Ministry of Foreign Affairs was relocated there from Singha Durbar in the late 1970s a few years after a massive fire that engulfed the government's principal secretariat. Nepal Police Headquarters was also then moved out of Singha Durbar following the fire and the police training center was set up in the buildings adjoining Shital Niwas.

While there are demands to relocate the President's Office itself, some people have suggested that the President's Office can instead build a helipad in the nearby Bhairabnath Battalion barracks of the Nepal Army. "The Bhairabnath Battalion barracks is just across the road from the President’s Office. As the president is the commander-in-chief of Nepal Army, she can use such facility in the army barracks", said a former minister, asking not to be named.

See also
Rana palaces of Nepal
Singha Durbar

References

External links
Website of the Office of the President (in Nepali language).

Presidential residences
Palaces in Kathmandu
Rana palaces of Nepal
Official residences in Nepal